Justo Figuerola (1770 in Lambayeque, Peru – 1854 in Lima, Peru) served as the 18th (March 15, 1843 – March 20, 1843) and 21st (August 11, 1844 – October 7, 1844) President of Peru.

He served as the President of the Congress twice in 1823.

References

See also
 List of presidents of Peru

1771 births
1854 deaths
Presidents of Peru
Presidents of the Congress of the Republic of Peru